Tongren is a prefecture-level city in eastern Guizhou province, People's Republic of China, located within a tobacco planting and crop agricultural area. Tongren was known as Tongren Prefecture until November 2011, when it was converted into a prefecture-level city.

History
During the Yongle period (1403–1424) of the Ming dynasty (1368–1644), two local governments known as "Sizhou Xuanweisi"and "Sinan Xuanweisi" resisted full subjugation. Yongle Emperor sent troops to pacify the rebellion and set up a provincial administrative region known as "Guizhou Buzhengshisi". Since then, their administrators were appointed by the central government.

Administrative divisions
Tongren comprises 2 districts, 4 counties, and 4 autonomous counties.
Districts:
Bijiang District
Wanshan District
Counties: 
Dejiang County
Jiangkou County
Sinan County
Shiqian County
Autonomous counties: 
Yuping Dong Autonomous County
Songtao Miao Autonomous County
Yinjiang Tujia and Miao Autonomous County
Yanhe Tujia Autonomous County

Climate

Economy
In July 2018, the Tongren Transportation & Tourism Investment Group announced a joint venture with Hyperloop Transportation Technologies to construct a Hyperloop track in Tongren, along with an industrial research park.

The city is served by Tongren Fenghuang Airport.

Education

 Tongren Polytechnic College
 Tongren No. 1 Middle School (Bijiang District)

References

External links

 
Cities in Guizhou
Prefecture-level divisions of Guizhou